4-Hydroxy-N,N-dibutyltryptamine (4-HO-DBT) is a psychedelic drug belonging to the tryptamine family.  It is found either as its crystalline hydrochloride salt or as an oily or crystalline base. 4-HO-DBT was first made by the chemist Alexander Shulgin and reported in his book TiHKAL. Shulgin reported a dosage of 20 mg orally to be without effects. However this compound has subsequently been sold as a "research chemical" and anecdotal reports suggest that at higher doses 4-HO-DBT is indeed an active hallucinogen, although somewhat weaker than other similar tryptamine derivatives.

Several different isomers of this compound could be made (see DBT for a fuller discussion) but of these only the isobutyl isomer 4-HO-DIBT was synthesised by Shulgin (mp 152-154 °C) and was also found to be inactive at a 20 mg dose.

External links
 TiHKAL entry
 4-HO-DBT entry in TiHKAL • info

Psychedelic tryptamines